Atedo Peterside  (born in July 1955) is a Nigerian entrepreneur, investment banker, and economist. He is the founder of Stanbic IBTC Bank Plc, Anap Business Jets Limited (Anap Jets), and the Atedo N. A. Peterside Foundation (Anap Foundation).

Education
Peterside had his secondary school education at the King's College Lagos. He then proceeded to The City University, London (1973-1976) where he obtained a B.Sc. degree in Economics. He went on to obtain an M.Sc. (also in Economics) from the London School of Economics and Political Science in 1977. His executive education is wide and varied, and includes the Owner/President Management Program at the Harvard Business School from 1991–1993. He was conferred with an honorary Doctor of Science Degree by the University of Port Harcourt, Nigeria and was also elected an Honorary Fellow of the Chartered Institute of Stockbrokers on 1 April 2019.

Career
Peterside founded the Investment Banking & Trust Company Limited (IBTC) in February 1989 at age 33. He served as the Bank's CEO till 2007.

IBTC opted to comply with the Central Bank of Nigeria order in 2005 (that all commercial banks had to have a N25 billion minimum capital base) by raising more capital and also acquiring two commercial banks; Chartered Bank Plc and Regent Bank Plc, in order to become a universal bank on 19 December 2005. It then changed its name to IBTC Chartered Bank Plc.

On 24 September 2007, IBTC Chartered Bank Plc merged with Stanbic Bank Nigeria Limited to form Stanbic IBTC Bank Plc, and he was elected Chairman of Stanbic IBTC Bank in October 2007.

Peterside was Group Chairman of Stanbic IBTC Holdings Plc from August 2012. Having overseen a number of regulatory matters through to completion, he announced his resignation on 21 March 2017 with effect from 31 March 2017.

He is currently the Chairman of Anap Jets Limited which commenced business on 1 January 2015. He also sits on the boards of both The Standard Bank of South Africa Limited and Standard Bank Group Limited.

He was a member of the National Economic Management Team (2007–2015), and member of the National Council on Privatization (2010–2015). Until the end of March 2020, Peterside sat on the Board of Directors of Flour Mills of Nigeria, Nigerian Breweries and Unilever Nigeria. He was the Non-Executive Chairman of Cadbury Nigeria Plc from April 2010 till 30 June 2020. Peterside resigned from the Boards of all these quoted brands in Nigeria so as to focus more of his time on the work of Anap Foundation. He is also the Chairman of ART X Collective Limited and Endeavor High Impact Entrepreneurship Ltd/Gte, a non-profit organisation that provides mentorship and support to scale up companies. Peterside also serves on the African Advisory Board of the Prince's Trust International.

In May 2022, Atedo Peterside won the Lifetime Achievement Award for his contribution to banking at the African Banker Awards staged in Accra, Ghana by African Development Bank. At the award Ceremony, he sent a powerful message saying that he built the bank by getting everyone working there from Day One in 1989 to buy into the mission of the bank and its shared values and culture.

Contribution to politics and public policy in Nigeria 
Peterside has used his visible public platforms to comment on, or influence politics and public policy in Nigeria. He has also held various advisory roles to the government of Nigeria but never agreed to accept a full-time public sector appointment.

He was 1 of 3 Conveners of Concerned Professionals back in 1993 which was an attempt to make various professionals politically active in response to the annulment of June 12, 1993 elections and the fight for the restoration of democracy in Nigeria.

He was appointed the Chairman of the Committee on Corporate Governance of Public Companies in Nigeria. The Committee drafted the first Code of Best Practices for Public Companies operating in Nigeria, which was published in October 2003.

Between 2007 and 2010 and also between  2011 and 2015, he was a member of the National Economic Management Team.

Between 2007 and 2011, he was the honorary adviser to the Governor of Rivers State.

Between 2011 and 2015, he was on the National Council on Privatisation (NCP), and successfully oversaw the privatisation of the Nigerian power sector amongst other transactions. He was also the Chairman of the NCP's Technical Committee.

In January 2012, he made a strong case on national television for the removal of N1.3 trillion petrol subsidy when it was an unpopular position to take.

In early 2014 he was appointed a Federal Government of Nigeria Delegate to the National Conference which held in that year.

In January 2017, he wrote an op-ed listing eleven recommended actions for the turnaround of the Nigerian economy.

Since 30 May 2017, he has served as the Alternate Private Sector Vice-Chairman of the Nigerian Industrial Policy and Competitiveness Advisory Council.

In March 2020, he declined an invitation to attend a forum being organized by Nigeria's Central Bank because he was not pleased by the dethronement and illegal exile/banishment of the Emir of Kano Muhammadu Sanusi II.

On 22 March 2020, Peterside set up the Anap Foundation COVID-19 Think Tank 

In May 2020 he was named Co-Chairman (alongside the Finance Minister) of the Steering Committee for the new National Development Plan for Nigeria.

On 9 September 2020, the National Steering Committee for Agenda 2050 and the 2021-25 Development Plan was inaugurated by President Buhari. Mr Peterside, in his capacity as Co-Chairman, made some pertinent opening remarks on the difficulty of getting Nigerians to embrace economic reforms at the televised Inaugural Meeting of the Steering Committee which held on that same day.

On Friday, 23 October 2020, Atedo Peterside made a landmark appearance on Arise TV's Morning Show from 9am to 10am during which he was interviewed by a panel of 3 journalists. The frank, bold and very informative interview engaged and gripped the nation in the aftermath of the #EndSARS and #EndPoliceBrutality Protests which had attained global attention and which were marred by the tragic Lekki Toll Gate shootings of peaceful protesters who were singing and waving the Nigerian National Flag on October 20, 2020; Bloody Tuesday. In a gripping interview, Atedo Peterside condoled families who had lost loved ones, criticised President Buhari's address to the nation on 22 October 2020, admonished the authorities for illegally trying to block the bank accounts of some of the Protest sympathisers and pointed the way forward for the youths via political activism and the forthcoming 2023 elections.

In late November 2021, Atedo Peterside published an article in major Nigerian newspapers entitled: 2023 elections: Hitting rock bottom, finding a way up. The #GoNigeria initiative which is a non-profit, non-party movement focuses on building a new voice for the young people in Nigeria and also encourages Nigerian youths to become politically active and register en-masse to vote in future elections, beginning with the 2023 General Elections.

The Initiative was launched by Anap Foundation in early December 2021; Mr. Peterside featured on an exclusive GoNigeria Arise TV interview on Tuesday, 07 December, 2021; in a Question and Answer session with Charles Aniagolu to further explain what the #GoNigeria initiative was all about.

Philanthropic work
Peterside founded the Anap Foundation, a non-profit organisation that is committed to promoting good governance. He has been the President from inception in 2003.

Anap Foundation COVID-19 Think Tank 
On 18 March 2020, Peterside appeared on Channels Television to warn Nigerians about the danger of complacency, listing four major reasons why Coronavirus disease may hit Nigeria harder than the rest of the world. The video was widely shared on social media. He has also called on the Nigerian government "to use various agencies at its disposal to enforce quarantine following the spread of COVID-19 in the country."

The Anap Foundation COVID-19 Think Tank was founded on 22 March 2020 to help Nigeria overcome the COVID-19 pandemic threat. It is composed of eighteen members from across the six geopolitical zones of Nigeria and the diaspora (USA & Germany). These are volunteers "with decades of expertise in medicine, logistics, e-commerce, economics, finance, law, communications, religious knowledge, academia, mobilization, advocacy, sustainability, governance, accountancy, actuarial science, health management organisations, grant making and international disaster management."

The Foundation has also released "Coronavirus Alert" in major Nigerian languages to alert the public to the issues facing the country with the pandemic.

On 4 February, the Anap Foundation COVID-19 Think Tank collaborated with Media Houses to launch a Name and Shame Initiative for violators of the COVID-19 safety protocols.

National honours 
In 2010, Peterside was awarded the Commander of the Order of the Niger (CON), one of Nigeria's top honours.

Personal life
Atedo Peterside (Arusibidabo of Opobo Kingdom) is married to Mrs. Abiodun Peterside (nee Pearce). They have three children, Tokini, Atowari, and Tariye. Tokini Peterside is the founder of ART X Lagos.

His father Chief Michael Clement Atowari Peterside (Sunju IX), who lived from 24 June 1918 to 15 January 2016, was an Ophthalmologist and a retired Controller of Medical Services in the Old Rivers State. He held the Nigerian chieftaincy title of the head chief of the Sunju Peterside chieftaincy family of Opobo. At his death, the chief was 97.

Peterside's mother is Patricia Awune Gboloba Bob-Manuel. At the time of her marriage, she was a princess of the royal family of Abonnema.

Peterside lists his hobbies as boating, polo, reading, and traveling.

Notable speeches and interviews 

 "Shared responsibility: Building and sustaining a strong economic future for Nigeria" | Speech given as a Keynote Speaker at the Silver Jubilee (25th Anniversary) of the Nigerian Economic Summit in Abuja. (October, 2019)
 "The Ugly Side of Buhari and Jonathan" | An op-ed published on the back page of THISDAY Newspaper, on January 27, 2015.
 "Business Aviation is a Necessity in Africa  | Interview with Mr Chinedu Eze of THISDAY Newspaper published on 4th May 2015.
 "Beware of 9 Mistakes that haunt Nigeria By Atedo N. A. Peterside" | Speech given on the floor of the National Conference during the week of 7–11 April 2014 and published in the back page of BusinessDay Newspaper on April 8, 2014.
"Letter to my Countrymen: This National Conference Must Succeed" | op-ed essay published on the back of THIS DAY Newspaper of March 10, 2014
"NIGERIA: TIME TO DELIVER | A welcome address at the fifth edition of the annual Standard Bank West Africa Investors' Conference.
"Eleven Actions Required for Speedy Economic Turnaround" by Atedo Peterside" | Op-ed essay published in the Global Monitor on 25 January 2017.
"Final Tribute to Dad, Chief M C A Peterside," published on the back page of ThisDay February 12, 2016

References

Living people
1955 births
Nigerian business executives
Nigerian bankers
20th-century Nigerian businesspeople
21st-century Nigerian businesspeople
Nigerian investment bankers
Nigerian chairpersons of corporations
King's College, Lagos alumni
Alumni of the London School of Economics
Businesspeople from Lagos
Alumni of City, University of London